La Moneda is a station on the Santiago Metro in Santiago, Chile. It is underground, between the stations Los Héroes and Universidad de Chile on the same line. It is located on the Avenida Libertador General Bernardo O'Higgins, in the commune of Santiago. The station was opened on 15 September 1975 as the eastern terminus of the inaugural section of the line between San Pablo and La Moneda. On 31 March 1977 the line was extended to Salvador.

It is named for the nearby Palacio de La Moneda.

References

Santiago Metro stations
Railway stations opened in 1975
1975 establishments in Chile
Santiago Metro Line 1